Elena Bajo is a visual artist, born in Spain, who currently works out of Los Angeles, California, USA.

Biography 
Bajo received a Master of Arts in Architecture in 2002 from the Escola de Architectura in Barcelona Spain. She then received a Master of Fine Arts from Central Saint Martins School of Art in London. She lives and works in Los Angeles, CA United States and Berlin, Germany

Career 
Bajo's work bridges a variety of media including installation, sculpture, painting, performance, participatory events, film and text.

Works

Individual shows 

2016 Throwing Car Parts from a Cliff before Sunrise - Garcia Galeria, Madrid (Spain)
2015 Isle of Innocence" After Fordlandia Kunsthalle São Paulo, Brazil
2014 With Entheogenic Intent (Burn the Witch)18th Street Arts Center, Los Angeles, California USA
2007 The Garden of Dreams – Museum of the City Galway Ireland

References

Further reading 
 Von Jetzt bis Dann
 Elena Bajo: Architectures of Disorder
 Von Jetzt bis Dann - Goldrausch 2008
 On Uncertain Terms: The Politics of the Everyday: The Anarchy of Performance, Objects, Spaces and Situations (Researching the Unarchived)
 Factory of Forms: Relational Settings. A Relational Vehicle by Elena Bajo

1976 births
Living people
Spanish installation artists
Women installation artists
Spanish sculptors
Spanish performance artists
20th-century Spanish painters
21st-century Spanish painters
20th-century Spanish women artists
21st-century Spanish women artists